This article is a list of diseases of Erythranthe  (formerly Mimulus), Monkey-Flower (Erythranthe × hybridus) as reported by the American Phytopathological Society.

Bacterial diseases

Fungal diseases

Viral diseases

Phytoplasmal diseases

References

Common Names of Diseases, The American Phytopathological Society

Erythranthe, monkey-flower